Let There Be Blood is a studio album with re-recorded songs of Exodus's 1985 Bonded by Blood, featuring their lineup at the time. The only band members who play on both Bonded by Blood and Let There Be Blood are guitarist Gary Holt and drummer Tom Hunting. The track "Hell's Breath" originally appears on the "1983 Rehearsal" with Kirk Hammett and never was recorded officially.

Reception

Let There Be Blood has met mixed reviews. The musical quality of the album has been praised, but reviewers have questioned the need for such a re-make, with Cosmo Lee of Allmusic going so far as to accuse it of being a potential "cash-in" on the original album's legacy. However, Gary Holt has said that the band was not trying to replace the original, but rather wanted to give the songs "the benefit of modern production." In its first week of release, Let There Be Blood sold 2,000 copies in the U.S.

Track listing

Personnel
Rob Dukes – vocals
Gary Holt – guitars
Lee Altus – guitars
Jack Gibson – bass
Tom Hunting – drums

References

2008 remix albums
Albums with cover art by Pär Olofsson
Exodus (American band) albums
Nuclear Blast albums